Velvet Chains is an American hard rock band based in Las Vegas, Nevada.

The band was formed in 2018 in Las Vegas, Nevada by Nils Goldschmidt. He recruited the original lineup through an ad he posted on Craigslist.

The band launched its first album "Icarus" on 24 September 2021. It was released with 10 songs, including two singles "Tattooed" and "Strangelove". It features guest appearances by guitarist Richard Fortus from Guns N' Roses, and bassist Jeff Rouse and guitarist Mike Squires, both from Duff McKagan's Loaded. Its recording took place in early 2021 at different studios in Las Vegas and Seattle; songs co-written with Drew Lawrence, sound engineering done by Greg Williamson, and mixing and mastering was done by Tristan Hardin.

The first single "Tattooed" features special guest appearance of Guns N' Roses guitarist Richard Fortus and it was released in July 2021. The song's music video was directed by Dean Karr.

The band launched its second EP "Morbid Dreams" on 21 October 2022. It was released with 6 songs, including three singles "Last Drop", "Back On The Train" and "Can't Win". Its recording took place in early 2022 at different studios in Las Vegas; songs co-written with Drew Lawrence, and production done by Kane Churko and Monster Sound & Picture.

The band participated in Rock Fest 2022 which was held July 13–16 in Cadott, Wisconsin and in Blue Ridge Rock Fest 2022 which was held September 8–11 in Alton, Virginia.

Members

Current members
Nils Goldschmidt - bass
Laurent Cassiano - lead guitar and backing vocals
Jason Hope - drums
Larry Cassiano - rhythm guitar and backing vocals
Ro Viper - lead vocals

Past members
Jerry Quinlan - lead vocals and rhythm guitar
Noelle Schertzer - drums

Discography

Icarus (2021)
It was released on 24 September 2021 with 10 songs, including two singles "Tattooed" and "Strangelove".
 Before We Shine
 Burning City
 Tattooed
 Pass The Disease
 Wasted
 Strangelove
 Flexing
 Sex Slave
 Teenage Stoner
 Gone

Morbid Dreams (2022)
It was released on 21 October 2022 with 6 songs, including three singles "Last Drop", "Back On The Train" and "Can't Win".
 Back On The Train
 Last Drop
 Hiding From Stars
 Can't Win
 Time Stood Still
 Fade Away

Awards

References

Rock music groups from Nevada
Musical groups established in 2018
American hard rock musical groups